Emam Qoli (also Romanized as Emām Qolī and Emāmqolī; also known as Emāmqolī Dīreh) is a village in Direh Rural District, in the Central District of Gilan-e Gharb County, Kermanshah Province, Iran. At the 2006 census, its population was 84, in 16 families.

References 

Populated places in Gilan-e Gharb County